The 2001 Mountain Dew Southern 500, the 52nd running of the event, was a NASCAR Winston Cup Series race held on September 2, 2001 at Darlington Raceway in Darlington, South Carolina. Contested at 367 laps on the 1.366 mile (2.198 km) speedway, it was the 25th race of the 2001 NASCAR Winston Cup Series season. Ward Burton of Bill Davis Racing won the race.

Background
Darlington Raceway, nicknamed by many NASCAR fans and drivers as "The Lady in Black" or "The Track Too Tough to Tame" and advertised as a "NASCAR Tradition", is a race track built for NASCAR racing located near Darlington, South Carolina. It is of a unique, somewhat egg-shaped design, an oval with the ends of very different configurations, a condition which supposedly arose from the proximity of one end of the track to a minnow pond the owner refused to relocate. This situation makes it very challenging for the crews to set up their cars' handling in a way that will be effective at both ends.

The track, Darlington Raceway,  is a four-turn  oval. The track's first two turns are banked at twenty-five degrees, while the final two turns are banked two degrees lower at twenty-three degrees.

Entry list

Qualifying

Results

NOTES:
  Steve Park was injured during the support race Saturday.  Kenny Wallace started the car.
 (o):  Teams that did not qualify were awarded owner points based on speed.  (The procedure ended in 2011.)

Race statistics
 Time of race: 4:05:00
 Average Speed: 
 Pole Speed: 168.048
 Cautions: 11 for 51 laps
 Margin of Victory: under caution
 Lead changes: 19
 Percent of race run under caution: 14.2%         
 Average green flag run: 28.6 laps

References

Mountain Dew Southern 500
Mountain Dew Southern 500
Mountain Dew Southern 500
NASCAR races at Darlington Raceway